Miusovo is a rural locality (a selo) and the administrative center of Miusovskoye Rural Settlement, Danilovsky District, Volgograd Oblast, Russia. The population was 187 as of 2010. There are 6 streets.

Geography 
The village is located in steppe, 11 km from Danilovka and 250 km from Volgograd.

References 

Rural localities in Danilovsky District, Volgograd Oblast